Bob Crenshaw Award is an annual award presented to a player on the Florida State Seminoles football team to recognize individual performance. The awards are the typical of most athletic awards, such as Most Valuable Player and Defensive Seminole Warrior Awards.  However, the Tallahassee Quarterback Club sponsors an award that is given in memory of a special Seminole football player whose courage and fighting spirit was an inspiration to others.

The award is given in the memory of Robert E. (Bob) Crenshaw who played Florida State Seminoles football from 1952 to 1955. The 175 pounds offensive lineman was the captain of the team in 1954 and a student leader. He was killed in a jet crash in 1958. The plaque's inscription reads: "To the football player with the Biggest Heart." The recipient is chosen by his teammates as the man who best exemplifies the qualities that made Bob Crenshaw an outstanding football player and person.

Award winners

1958: Al Ulmer, Guard
1959: Ramon Rogers, Center
1960: Abner Bigbie, Fullback
1961: Paul Andrews, Fullback
1962: Jim Sims, Tackle
1963: Larry Brinkley, Fullback
1964: Dick Hermann, Linebacker
1965: Howard Ehler, Defensive Back
1966: Ed Pope, Guard
1967: Kim Hammond, Quarterback
1968: Billy Gunter, Running Back
1969: Stan Walker, Guard
1970: Bill Lohse, Linebacker
1971: Bill Henson, Defensive Tackle
1972: David Snell, Defensive Back
1973: Steve Bratton, Defensive End
1974: Jeff Gardner, Offensive Guard
1975: Lee Nelson, Defensive Back
1976: Joe Camps, Defensive Back
1977: Aaron Carter, Linebacker
1978: Scott Warren, Defensive End
1979: Greg Futch, Offensive Tackle
1980: Monk Bonasorte, Defensive Back
1981: Barry Voltapetti, Offensive Tackle
1982: Blair Williams, Quarterback
1983: Ken Roe, Linebacker
1984: Todd Stroud, Noseguard
1985: Pete Panton, Tight End
1986: Greg Newell, Free Safety
1987: Mark Salva,  Center
1988: Jason Kuipers, Offensive Guard
1989: Tony Yeomans, Offensive Guard
1990: Lawrence Dawsey, Wide Receiver
1991: Dan Footman, Defensive End
1992: Robbie Baker, Center
1993: Jon Nance,  Noseguard
1994: Steve Gilmer, Safety & Enzo Armella,  Noseguard
1995: Todd Rebol, Linebacker
1996: Connell Spain,  Defensive Tackle
1997: Greg Spires,  Defensive End
1998: Troy Saunders,  Corner Back
1999: Reggie Durden,  Corner Back
2000: Patrick Newton, Linebacker
2001: Bradley Jennings,  Linebacker
2002: Anquan Boldin, Wide Receiver
2003: David Castillo, Center
2004: Bryant McFadden, Corner Back
2005: Andre Fluellen, Defensive Tackle
2006: Darius McClure, Safety
2007: Anthony Houllis, Rover
2008: Ryan McMahon, Center
2009: Markus White, Defensive End & Ryan McMahon, Center
2010: Andrew Datko, Offensive Tackle
2011: EJ Manuel, Quarterback & Lamarcus Joyner, Safety 
2012: Devonta Freeman, Running Back & Telvin Smith, Linebacker
2013: Devonta Freeman, Running Back & Lamarcus Joyner, Safety 
2014: Josue Matias, Offensive Guard & Eddie Goldman, Defensive Tackle 
2015: Kareem Are, Offensive Guard & Reggie Northrup, Linebacker
2016: Deondre Francois, Quarterback
2017: Derrick Kelly II, Offensive Guard
2018: Derrick Kelly II, Offensive Guard
2019: James Blackman, Quarterback
2021: Jordan Wilson, Tight End
2022: Mycah Pittman, Wide Receiver & Camren McDonald, Tight End

References

External links
 Garnet & Old

College football awards
Florida State Seminoles football
1958 establishments in Florida